Falls Road Historic District is a national historic district located at Rocky Mount, Nash County, North Carolina.  It encompasses 75 contributing buildings and 1 contributing structure in a residential section of Rocky Mount. The buildings primarily date between about 1900 and 1950, and include notable examples of Queen Anne, Colonial Revival, and Classical Revival style residential architecture.  Notable buildings include the Lyon-Looney House (c. 1908), T.B. Bunn House (c. 1905), Thorpe-Gay House (early 1900s), William E. Fenner House (c. 1914), Whitehead House (1923), R. H. Gregory House (1950), and the Wilkinson School (1923).

It was listed on the National Register of Historic Places in 1999.

References

Historic districts on the National Register of Historic Places in North Carolina
Queen Anne architecture in North Carolina
Colonial Revival architecture in North Carolina
Neoclassical architecture in North Carolina
National Register of Historic Places in Nash County, North Carolina